Hill Cottage is a historic cure cottage located at Saranac Lake, town of Harrietstown in Essex and Franklin County, New York.  It was built about 1913 and is a two to four story, shingled frame house on a stone foundation, with a jerkinhead gable roof and built into the side of a hill.  It features an open first floor porch and second story cure porch on the front facade, four stories of cure porches in the rear, and prominent roof overhangs.  It is in the American Craftsman style and designed specifically for use as a private sanatorium.

It was listed on the National Register of Historic Places in 1992. It is located in the Helen Hill Historic District.

References

External links
 Hill Cottage at Historic Saranac Lake

Houses on the National Register of Historic Places in New York (state)
Houses completed in 1913
Houses in Franklin County, New York
Houses in Essex County, New York
1913 establishments in New York (state)
National Register of Historic Places in Essex County, New York
Individually listed contributing properties to historic districts on the National Register in New York (state)